An undergraduate research journal is an academic journal dedicated to publishing the work of undergraduate research students. Such journals have been described as important for the professionalization of students into their academic discipline and a more substantive opportunity to experience the publication and peer review process than inclusion in the acknowledgments or as one of many authors on a traditional publication. The model has been described as well established in the United States and as a potential extension to the traditional undergraduate dissertation written by students in the United Kingdom. A case study of student participation in the journal Reinvention: A Journal of Undergraduate Research, found that the process challenges the "student as consumer" model of higher education.

Examples

Many universities maintain such journals for their own undergraduates, such as the Beloit Biologist, a Beloit College publication that launched in the early 1970s. Some scholarly societies also maintain venues for the dissemination of undergraduate research, for example as special sessions at academic conferences. Non-institutional journals may be sponsored by professional societies — for example, the American Institute of Physics published the undergraduate-peer-reviewed Journal of Undergraduate Research in Physics starting in 1981, with a temporary hiatus beginning in 2014. The Journal of Young Investigators, which has received support through science-education grants from the United States National Science Foundation, the Burroughs Wellcome Fund, and Duke University, is managed primarily by undergraduates and is regarded as innovative because students are involved in reviewing and editing papers for publication. A similar model exists for the Midwest Journal of Undergraduate Research, published at Monmouth College since 2010.

Variations on the model may accept work from even younger students; for example, the Journal of Emerging Investigators, managed by graduate students at Harvard University, publishes work by middle school and high school students under the guidance of a teacher or mentor. In 2014, a JEI paper gained widespread international media attention for its recommendation that the United States government save money on ink by changing official fonts.

To counter a criticism listed below, the American Journal of Undergraduate Research has relied on a rigorous, faculty-led peer-review process.

Criticism

The model of separate journals specifically for undergraduates has been criticized for several reasons. Such journals may not be indexed in common literature databases and publishing research in an undergraduate-only venue may make it difficult for others to find the work. Concerns have also been expressed that the process could increase stress and competitiveness in undergraduate research.

References

Academic publishing
Undergraduate education